The Computational Complexity Conference (CCC), is an academic conference in the field of theoretical computer science whose roots date to 1986. It fosters research in computational complexity theory, and is typically held annually between mid-May and mid-July in North America or Europe. As of 2015, CCC is organized independently by the Computational Complexity Foundation (CCF).

History 
CCC was first organized in 1986 under the name "Structure in Complexity Theory Conference" (Structures) with support from the US National Science Foundation. The conference was sponsored by the IEEE Computer Society Technical Committee on Mathematical Foundations of Computing from 1987-2014. In 1996, the conference was renamed the "Annual IEEE Conference on Computational Complexity", hence establishing the current acronym "CCC". In 2014, a movement towards independence and open access proceedings led to the establishment of the Computational Complexity Foundation (CCF). Since 2015, CCF organizes the conference independently under the name Computational Complexity Conference (CCC), and publishes open access proceedings via LIPIcs. Future and past conference websites, as well as past programs and call for papers, are archived online.

Scope 
CCC broadly targets research in computational complexity theory. This currently includes (but is not limited to) the study of models of computation ranging from deterministic to quantum to algebraic, as well as resource constraints such as time, randomness, input queries, etc.

Logistics 
 
CCC is annually held between mid-May and mid-July, with a scientific program running approximately three days. The conference is composed of a single-track. Activities in addition to the scientific program typically include an opening reception, a rump session, and a business meeting.

Awards 
CCC annually confers up to two awards: A "Best Student Paper Award", aimed at papers authored solely by students, and (since 2001) a "Best Paper Award", given to the most outstanding paper at the respective year's conference.

References

External links 
 Computational Complexity Conference (CCC) web page
 Computational Complexity Foundation (CCF) web page

Theoretical computer science conferences